María Elena Solar Power Plant (Spanish: Planta Termosolar María Elena) is a concentrated solar power plant with a molten-salt technology system that is currently under construction in the commune of María Elena in the Antofagasta Region of Chilé.

The María Elena complex will be made up of four separate 100 MW plants, for a total capacity of 400 MW, and will supply the northern SING (Sistema Interconectado del Norte Gande) grid via a 17.5 km, 220 kV double circuit transmission line connected to the Encuentro substation. 
The $3.6 billion thermo solar plant will be the largest plant of its kind in the world.
The project is being developed by Ibereólica Solar Atacama, a subsidiary of Madrid-based Grupo Ibereólica. 
It will employ 1,500 workers during the construction stage and 200 as permanent staff when in operation. 
Construction will take 27 months so the plant will be operational in July 2016 at the earliest.

See also

 Solar power in Chile
 Energy in Chile
 List of solar thermal power stations
 Atacama Desert

References

External links
  Municipality of María Elena

Communes of Chile
Populated places in Tocopilla Province